The 1992 ABC Under-18 Championship was the twelfth edition of the Asian Championship for Junior Men. The tournament took place in Beijing, China from 25 September to 2 October 1992.

 successfully regained the title by thrashing  in the championship match, 93-80, for their fourth overall championship.

Preliminary round
All times are in Chinese Standard Time (UTC+08:00)

Group A

Group B

Group C

Group D

Quarterfinal round

Group I

Group II

Final round

Semifinals

3rd place

Final

Final standing

Awards

References

FIBA Asia Under-18 Championship
1992 in Asian basketball
1992–93 in Chinese basketball
International basketball competitions hosted by China
September 1992 sports events in Asia
October 1992 sports events in Asia
1990s in Beijing